Gaston Grandain (16 April 1911 – 2000) was a Belgian football referee.

Refereeing career
Grandain was assigned as a FIFA referee in 1956.

In 1960, Grandain was appointed as a referee for the 1960 European Nations' Cup, where he officiated a semi-final match between France and Yugoslavia.

Grandain retired from refereeing in 1961. He died in 2000.

References

External links
 Profile at worldfootball.net

1911 births
2000 deaths
People from Ixelles
Belgian football referees
1960 European Nations' Cup referees
Sportspeople from Brussels